Lansford may refer to:
 Lansford, Pennsylvania
 Lansford, North Dakota